is a Japanese former professional tennis player.

Koura was born in Nishinomiya and competed on the international circuit in the 1960s and 1970s.

While studying commerce in the 1960s he represented Japan at the University Games, where he won two silver medals and a bronze medal in doubles events.

Koura played in the main draw of the 1967 French Championships and was runner up at the 1971 Tokyo Indoor.

In the early 1970s he was a member Japan's Davis Cup team, featuring in three ties as a doubles player. This included a win over Australia in Tokyo in 1971, which was the first time in 50 years the Japanese had defeated the Australians.

Koura opened up a tennis college in Osaka in the mid 1970s, which has produced players such as Kimiko Date and Yuko Hosoki. He is a former captain of the Japanese Fed Cup team.

See also
List of Japan Davis Cup team representatives

References

External links
 
 
 

1942 births
Living people
Japanese male tennis players
People from Nishinomiya
Sportspeople from Hyōgo Prefecture
Japanese tennis coaches
Universiade medalists in tennis
Universiade silver medalists for Japan
Universiade bronze medalists for Japan
Medalists at the 1963 Summer Universiade
Medalists at the 1967 Summer Universiade
20th-century Japanese people